The Foreign Student is the first novel by Asian-American author Susan Choi, published in 1998.

Plot
In 1955, 25-year-old Chang (“Chuck”) Ahn arrives at The University of the South in Sewanee, Tennessee from Korea after the Korean War ends. He meets 28-year-old Katherine Monroe, who lives year-round in her family’s summer home in Sewanee. Chuck and Katherine become friends.

Katherine is in an ill-defined relationship with Charles Addison, an English professor at the college and her father’s former roommate. Katherine and Charles began sleeping together when Katherine was only fourteen, and the discovery of their relationship led to Katherine’s mother refusing to speak to her anymore, a resolve she keeps up throughout Katherine’s adulthood.

During his time in college, Chuck remembers his experience during the Korean War, where he worked as a translator for the American forces. 

Charles unexpectedly proposes to Katherine, who accepts. When he hears news of their engagement, Chuck leaves Sewanee for Chicago to take a summer job in a book bindery that the dean of The University of the South arranges for him. After being repeatedly and falsely accused of stealing money, he steals $100 and boards a train to New Orleans, where Katherine is staying with her dying mother in her childhood home. 

Katherine breaks up with Charles and goes with Chuck and her mother to a house on the Gulf Coast. Chuck returns to Sewanee and promises to wait for Katherine while she cares for her mother. Chuck is expelled from school for his theft, but given a job at the school and the chance to work off his debt.

Reception 
Kirkus Reviews called the book, "An uneven first novel that elegantly details the love story of two young people.” A review by Publishers Weekly said, "Love develops between two troubled people from vastly different worlds in this impressive debut.” The Foreign Student won the Asian American Literary Award for Fiction.

References

Further reading 

1998 novels
Literature by Asian-American women